Adam Jacob Coon (born November 14, 1994) is an American Greco-Roman wrestler and American football player. He is an offensive guard for the Seattle Sea Dragons of the XFL. In 2018, he won the silver medal in the 130 kg event at the World Wrestling Championships held in Budapest, Hungary.

Career 
In 2019, Coon won the gold medal in the 130 kg event at the Pan American Wrestling Championships held in Buenos Aires, Argentina. In the same year, he also represented the United States at the 2019 Pan American Games in the 130 kg event without winning a medal; he was eliminated in his first match by Yasmani Acosta of Chile who went on to win one of the bronze medals.

At the 2019 World Wrestling Championships held in Nur-Sultan, Kazakhstan, he competed in the 130 kg event where he was eliminated in his first match by Meng Lingzhe of China.

In March 2020, at the Pan American Wrestling Championships held in Ottawa, Canada, he won the silver medal in the 130 kg event. A few days later, he competed in the 2020 Pan American Wrestling Olympic Qualification Tournament, also held in Ottawa, Canada, without qualifying for the 2020 Summer Olympics in Tokyo, Japan. In May 2021, he also failed to qualify for the Olympics at the World Olympic Qualification Tournament held in Sofia, Bulgaria.

On June 4, 2021, the Tennessee Titans signed Coon to play on the offensive line for them. He was an All-State linebacker in high school and was an honorable mention offensive lineman. He attended the University of Michigan but never played football for the team. On August 12, 2021, Coon was waived/injured by the Titans and placed on injured reserve. He was released on August 20.

Coon was assigned to the Seattle Sea Dragons of the XFL on January 6, 2023.

Achievements

References

External links 

 
 Adam Coon at the 2019 Pan American Games

1994 births
Living people
Place of birth missing (living people)
American male sport wrestlers
World Wrestling Championships medalists
Pan American Wrestling Championships medalists
Wrestlers at the 2019 Pan American Games
Pan American Games competitors for the United States
Tennessee Titans players
Players of American football from Michigan
American football offensive guards
21st-century American people
Seattle Sea Dragons players